Anthony Quiles (born June 27, 1972), better known by his stage name Q-Unique, is an American rapper, record producer and a member of rap group Arsonists and the hard rock band StillWell. He also contributed vocals for dance/hip-hop group C+C Music Factory.

Discography

Solo 
2003: Mixture
2004: Vengeance Is Mine
2006: Street Supreme
2008: The Collabo Tapes Vol. 1
2009: The Collabo Tapes Vol. 2
2010: Between Heaven & Hell
2011: Throwback
2013: The Remix Mixtape
2013: Marvels Team-Up
2014: DJ Presto One vs Q-Unique & ILL BILL
2016: BlaQ Coffee
2018: Momentum
2018: The Mechanic

With Arsonists 
1998: Arsonists Mixtape
1999: As The World Burns
2001: Past, Present, and Future
2001: Date of Birth
2018: Lost in the Fire

Stillwell 
2011: Dirtbag
2015: Raise It Up
2020: Supernatural Miracle
2022: Rock the House"

 Collaboration with Trem One 
2011: Omega Man Mk2 (feat. Q Unique)''

Singles

Solo 
 "Green Grass" (2011)

With Arsonists 
"The Session" (1996)
"Blaze/Geembo's Theme/Flashback" (1998),  Fondle 'Em
"Backdraft" (1999), Matador
"Pyromaniax" (1999), Matador
"Backdraft/Halloween II" (1999), Matador
"As the World Burns"  (1999), Matador – instrumental limited edition

Guest appearances

References

External links 

 Official website
 Q-Unique interview
 Q-Unique interview with OneTwoOneTwo

Rappers from Brooklyn
Living people
Underground rappers
21st-century American rappers
1972 births
C+C Music Factory members
StillWell members